Maurice Legg is a male former rower who competed for England and Great Britain. He had six children.  In order of age they are: Suzanne, Stephanie, Michael, David, Peter and John Paul.

Rowing career
He represented England and won a silver medal in the eights and a bronze medal in the coxed fours at the 1954 British Empire and Commonwealth Games in Vancouver, Canada. He was a member of the King's College BC and Thames Rowing Club and rowed at bow.

References

English male rowers
Commonwealth Games medallists in rowing
Commonwealth Games silver medallists for England
Commonwealth Games bronze medallists for England
Rowers at the 1954 British Empire and Commonwealth Games
1926 births
2006 deaths
Medallists at the 1954 British Empire and Commonwealth Games